These are the Billboard Hot 100 number-one hits of 1963.

That year, all but two acts (The Four Seasons and Bobby Vinton) achieved their first number-one singles, with a total of 19, which were Steve Lawrence, The Rooftop Singers, Paul & Paula, Ruby & the Romantics, The Chiffons, Little Peggy March, Jimmy Soul, Lesley Gore, Kyu Sakamoto, The Essex, Jan & Dean, The Tymes, Stevie Wonder (as ‘Little Stevie Wonder’), The Angels, Jimmy Gilmer & the Fireballs, Nino Tempo, April Stevens, Dale & Grace, and The Singing Nun. These artists only went to the top with these songs once (excluding Wonder, who would later go on to have ten songs hit number one).

Chart history

Number-one artists

See also
1963 in music
List of Billboard number-one singles

Sources
Fred Bronson's Billboard Book of Number 1 Hits, 5th Edition
Joel Whitburn's Top Pop Singles 1955-2008, 12 Edition
Joel Whitburn Presents the Billboard Hot 100 Charts: The Sixties
Additional information obtained can be verified within Billboard's online archive services and print editions of the magazine.

References

1963 record charts
1963